Courtney Fortson (born May 23, 1988) is an American professional basketball player for Spójnia Stargard of the Polish Basketball League (PLK). He played college basketball for the Arkansas Razorbacks.

High school
Fortson attended Jefferson Davis High School in Montgomery, Alabama, where he was named Mr. Basketball by the Alabama Sports Writers Association in 2007.

College career
He played his college basketball at the University of Arkansas as a guard, and recorded the school's second-ever triple double (20 points, 12 assists and 10 rebounds) in a December 2008 win over North Carolina Central University.

Professional career
After going undrafted in the 2010 NBA draft, Fortson signed with Steaua Turabo Bucuresti of Romania but later left in January 2011. In March 2011, he joined the Reno Bighorns of the NBA D-League.

In November 2011, Fortson was acquired by the Los Angeles D-Fenders. But on December 8, 2011, he was signed by the Los Angeles Clippers. However, he was later waived before the start of the 2011–12 season and re-joined the D-Fenders. Not long after being waived by the Clippers, he was called up on January 16, 2012 on a ten-day contract. However, he was waived by the team on January 27, 2012, after playing four games. Fortson signed a ten-day contract with the Houston Rockets later that season, and was eventually signed by the Rockets for the remainder of the season. In September 2012, he was waived by the Rockets. Fortson, again, signed with the Los Angeles Clippers for training camp on September 29, 2012, but on October 7, 2012, he and Chris Johnson were waived by the Clippers. Later that month, he joined the Los Angeles D-Fenders. On February 4, 2013, Fortson was named to the Futures All-Star roster for the 2013 NBA D-League All-Star Game.

In September 2013, he signed with Avtodor Saratov of Russia for the 2013–14 season. On June 3, 2014, he signed with Trotamundos de Carabobo for the rest of the 2014 LPB season. On July 5, 2014, he returned to Avtodor Saratov, signing for one more season. On February 18, 2015, Fortson scored a triple double in a EuroChallenge-game against Güssing Knights; he recorded 30 points, 12 rebounds and 13 assists and was named Weekly MVP.

On July 11, 2015, Fortson signed with the Turkish club Banvit. On March 9, 2016, he parted ways with Banvit after averaging 16.2 points, 4.3 rebounds and 6.5 assists per game in BSL.

In July 2016, Forston signed with Chinese club Zhejiang Lions for the 2016–17 CBA season. 

On January 4, 2017, Fortson recorded a triple-double after posting 22 points, 11 rebounds and a career-high 20 assists in a 117–130 loss to the Shandong Golden Stars.

Fortson was named the CBA MVP for the 2017–18 season, after he averaged 31.1 points, 12 assists and 7.8 rebounds per game while leading Zhejiang to the first seed in the CBA.

On July 26, 2021, Fortson signed with Bnei Herzliya of the Israeli Basketball Premier League.

On October 26, 2022, he signed with Spójnia Stargard of the Polish Basketball League (PLK).

Career Statistics

|-
| align=center | 2010–11
| align=left | CSA Steaua Bucuresti 
| Liga Nationala
| 5 || 23.0 || .378 || .333 || .875 || 3.6 || 3.2 || .6 || .0 || 9.2
|-
| align=center | 2011–12
| align=left | LA Clippers/Houston Rockets
| NBA
| 10 || 9.5 || .344 || .231 || .667 || 1.5 || 1.0 || .3 || .0 || 3.5
|-
| align=center | 2011–12
| align=left | LA D-Fenders/Rio Grande
| NBA D-League
| 31 || 34.6 || .471 || .396 || .796 || 4.5 || 6.2 || 2.1 || .1 || 17.2
|-
| align=center | 2012–13
| align=left | Los Angeles D-Fenders
| NBA D-League
| 46 || 38.4 || .398 || .355 || .766 || 5.0 || 7.1 || 2.0 || .1 || 17.8
|-
| align=center | 2014–15
| align=left | BC Avtodor Saratov
| FIBA Europe Cup
| 13 || 38.2 || .444 || .460 || .735 || 6.0 || 9.8 || 1.9 || .2 || 17.2
|-
| align=center | 2015–16
| align=left | Bandırma B.İ.K. 
| Turkish League
| 20 || 34.6 || .394 || .384 || .852 || 4.4 || 6.5 || 1.2 || .1 || 16.3
|-
| align=center | 2016–17
| align=left | Zhejiang Lions
| CBA
| 42 || 40.1 || .421 || .335 || .844 || 7.4 || 8.5 || 2.6 || .1 || 29.0
|-
| align=center | 2017–18
| align=left | Zhejiang Lions
| CBA
| 50 || 40.2 || .458 || .331 || .817 || 7.6 || 11.0 || 2.6 || .2 || 30.7
|-
| align=center | 2018–19
| align=left | Zhejiang Lions
| CBA
| 48 || 40.2 || .411 || .286 || .711 || 7.5 || 11.0 || 2.4 || .2 || 23.9
|-
| align=center | 2019–20
| align=left | Sichuan Blue Whales 
| CBA
| 30 || 35.8 || .454 || .330 || .770 || 6.3 || 7.3 || 1.5 || .0 || 27.4
|-
|-class=sortbottom
| align="center" colspan=2 | Career
| All Leagues
| 295 || 37.1 || .430 || .336 || .786 || 6.1 || 8.3 || 2.1 || .1 || 22.7

References

External links
Courtney Fortson at realgm.com
Courtney Fortson at eurobasket.com
Courtney Fortson at fiba.com

1988 births
Living people
American expatriate basketball people in China
American expatriate basketball people in the Dominican Republic
American expatriate basketball people in Romania
American expatriate basketball people in Russia
American expatriate basketball people in Venezuela
American men's basketball players
Arkansas Razorbacks men's basketball players
Bandırma B.İ.K. players
Basketball players from Montgomery, Alabama
BC Avtodor Saratov players
Houston Rockets players
Los Angeles Clippers players
Los Angeles D-Fenders players
Point guards
Reno Bighorns players
Rio Grande Valley Vipers players
Spójnia Stargard players
Trotamundos B.B.C. players
Undrafted National Basketball Association players
Zhejiang Lions players